Mary Callahan Erdoes (born August 13, 1967) is Chief Executive Officer of J.P. Morgan Asset & Wealth Management (a division of JPMorgan Chase), a global leader in investment management and private banking with over $4 trillion in client assets. She is also one of the longest standing members of JPMorgan Chase & Co.'s Operating Committee.

Early life and education 
Mary Callahan was born on August 13, 1967, to Patricia and Patrick Callahan, Jr. Patrick Callahan was a former partner at investment banking firm Lazard Freres. Callahan Erdoes was raised in Winnetka, Illinois, a North Shore suburb of Chicago. She was raised in a Roman Catholic family of Irish descent. Callahan Erdoes is an alumna of the all-girls Roman Catholic Woodlands Academy of the Sacred Heart in Lake Forest, Illinois. Erdoes completed her bachelor's degree at Georgetown University, majoring in Mathematics. She was the only woman to complete a mathematics major at Georgetown at that time. She earned her MBA at Harvard Business School.

Career 
Callahan Erdoes started her career with Stein Roe & Farnham, and described her maternal grandmother as instrumental for helping her get that job during college. She described her position there as a "glorified mailroom job". She then moved on to Bankers Trust, where she worked in corporate finance, merchant banking, and high-yield debt underwriting. Prior to joining J.P. Morgan, she was employed at Meredith, Martin & Kaye, a fixed-income specialty advisory firm, where she was responsible for credit research, trading, and individual portfolio management. In 1996, she joined J.P. Morgan Asset Management as head of fixed income for high-net-worth individuals, foundations, and endowments. In March 2005, she was appointed CEO of J.P. Morgan Private Bank. She assumed her current post in September 2009. She has been mentioned as a potential successor to JPMorgan Chase & Co. CEO Jamie Dimon.

Since 2012, Callahan Erdoes has been included in the 50 Most Influential list of Bloomberg Markets. Since March 2013, Business Insider included Callahan Erdoes on its list of the 25 most powerful women on Wall Street. Since 2016, Callahan Erdoes has been named one of the most powerful woman in the world by Forbes.

She is a board member of Robin Hood, the U.S. Fund for UNICEF. and the U.S.-China Business Council. She also served on the Federal Reserve Bank of New York's Investor Advisory Committee on Financial Markets.  Erdoes is also on the Board of Trustees for Georgetown University and on the Global Advisory Boards for the Harvard Business School and Harvard University.

Personal life 
Callahan Erdoes met her husband Philip Erdoes at Harvard Business School.  While Mrs Erdoes is Catholic, her husband is Jewish.  They live in New York City with their three daughters : Mia, Morgan and Mason. Her eldest daughter, Mia Erdoes, is a gymnast who competes at UCLA gymnastics team.

Callahan Erdoes donates to both the Democratic Party and Republican Party. She contributed to the presidential campaigns of John McCain and Mitt Romney in 2008 and 2012, respectively.

References 

American bankers
Businesspeople from New York City
People from Winnetka, Illinois
People from Chicago
1967 births
Living people
Harvard Business School alumni
JPMorgan Chase people
Georgetown College (Georgetown University) alumni
American women bankers
Schools of the Sacred Heart alumni
American women chief executives
20th-century American businesspeople
21st-century American businesspeople
American chief executives of financial services companies
New York (state) Republicans
20th-century American businesswomen
21st-century American businesswomen